Woodstock High School can refer to:
Woodstock Elementary School, part of Bibb County School District in Woodstock, Alabama
Woodstock Elementary School (Georgia), in Woodstock, Georgia
Woodstock Elementary School (Maine), in Bryant Pond, Maine
Woodstock School (Portland, Oregon), also known as Woodstock Elementary School, part of Portland Public Schools (Oregon) in Portland, Oregon
Woodstock Elementary School (Utah), in Murray, Utah